Farrukh Jaffar (1933 – 15 October 2021) was an Indian actress and radio presenter in Bollywood. Having begun her career with Vividh Bharti in 1963, she made a transition into acting with a supporting role in the 1981 film Umrao Jaan. Jaffar continued to act sporadically, and beginning in the late 2010s, gained wider recognition for working in a spate of critically successful films. At the age of 88, she won the Filmfare Award for Best Supporting Actress for her performance as Fatima Begum in Gulabo Sitabo, becoming the oldest winner of an acting Filmfare.

Personal life
Farrukh Jaffar was born in 1933 in Chakesar village of Jaunpur district, United Provinces of British India (present-day Uttar Pradesh). She attended a local school and later moved to Lucknow, where she graduated from the Lucknow University. Jaffar was married to Syed Muhammad Jaffar, a journalist and politician. The couple have two daughtersMehru Jaffar and Shaheen Ahmad  . 

Jaffar died on 15 October 2021 in Lucknow at the age of 88.

Filmography

Awards and nominations

References

External links

1933 births
2021 deaths
Indian film actresses
Actresses in Hindi cinema
Filmfare Awards winners
20th-century Indian actresses
People from Jaunpur district
University of Lucknow alumni